Belize competed at the 2022 Commonwealth Games in Birmingham, England between 28 July and 8 August 2022. The team participated in the Games for the eleventh time.

The Belize team consisted of 13 athletes (eight men and five women) competing in three sports.

Shaun Gill and Alicia Thompson were the country's flagbearers during the opening ceremony.

Competitors
The following is the list of number of competitors participating at the Games per sport/discipline.

Athletics

A squad of five athletes (two men, three women) was confirmed on 6 July 2022.

Men
Track and road events

Field events

Women
Track and road events

Field events

Cycling

A squad of seven cyclists (five men, two women) was selected on 4 May 2022.

Road
Men

Women

Triathlon

One triathlete was officially selected on 6 July 2022.

Individual

References

External links
BOCGA Official site

Nations at the 2022 Commonwealth Games
Belize at the Commonwealth Games
2022 in Belizean sport